South Slough National Estuarine Research Reserve (SSNERR) is a  National Estuarine Research Reserve located on Coos Bay Estuary, in the U.S. state of Oregon. Its headquarters are in Charleston.
Established in 1974, it was the first reserve in the United States created in response to the federal Coastal Zone Management Act of 1972.

The South Slough Interpretive Center features exhibits and a film about the flora, fauna, and ecology of the South Slough Estuary and its cultural history.  Programs include bird watching, tidepool explorations, nature walks, lectures and films. Maps and brochures are available, and there is also a gift shop.

References

External links
South Slough National Estuarine Research Reserve - State of Oregon
South Slough National Estuarine Research Reserve - National Oceanic and Atmospheric Administration

Protected areas of Coos County, Oregon
Estuaries of Oregon
National Estuarine Research Reserves of the United States
Protected areas of Oregon
Protected areas established in 1974
1974 establishments in Oregon
Lakes of Coos County, Oregon
Nature centers in Oregon